is a Japanese animated short film produced by Flat Studio and directed by Loundraw. It was released in Japanese theaters on November 12, 2021.

Voice cast

Production
In June 2020, animator and illustrator Loundraw revealed that he is producing a short theatrical anime film as part of the Project Common multimedia project. The film was unveiled in February 2021, with the project serving as Loundraw's directorial debut. It is produced by Loundraw's company Flat Studio, with scripts written by Hirotaka Adachi, and music composed by Akira Kosemura, Itoko Toma, Guiano, and Hideya Kojima.

Release

Theatrical
Summer Ghost was released in Japanese theaters on November 12, 2021 by its distributor Avex Pictures. It had its international premiere on the same day at the Leeds International Film Festival in England.

In North America, GKIDS will screen the film in Japanese and English language formats in Q3 2022. The film premiered at Anime Expo on July 3, 2022.

Home media
The film was released on Blu-ray in Japan on March 25, 2022. The limited edition version includes the original soundtrack, an 80-minute documentary of the film's production, animatics, and a special booklet. GKIDS and Shout! Factory released the film in North America on November 1, 2022, on Blu-ray and digital platforms.

Adaptations
A manga adaptation by Yoshi Inomi was serialized in Shueisha's Tonari no Young Jump website from October 8, 2021, to June 3, 2022. The chapters were compiled into two tankōbon volumes, released on November 19, 2021, and June 17, 2022.

Two novels were written by the film's scriptwriter Hirotaka Adachi. The first is a novelization that expands on the film's story which was released on October 29, 2021. The second is an original spin-off novel titled Ichinose Yūna ga Uiteiru (Yūna Ichinose Is Floating) which was released on November 26 of the same year.

In February 2023, Seven Seas Entertainment announced that they licensed the novel and manga adaptations, both of which will be released in digital and print formats in August of the same year.

References

External links
  
 

2021 films
2021 anime films
2021 manga
Anime short films
Japanese ghost films
Seinen manga
Seven Seas Entertainment titles
Shueisha manga